Yinoceratinae is one of three subfamilies of the goniatitid ammonoid family Pseudohaloritidae.

References
 The Paleobiology Database accessed on 10/01/07

Pseudohaloritidae